The 1979 Texas Tech Red Raiders football team represented Texas Tech University as a member of the Southwest Conference (SWC) during the 1979 NCAA Division I-A football season. In their second season under head coach Rex Dockery, the Red Raiders compiled a 3–6–2 record (2–5–1 against SWC opponents), were outscored by a combined total of 182 to 141, and finished in seventh place in the conference.  The team played its home games at Clifford B. and Audrey Jones Stadium in Lubbock, Texas.

Schedule

References

Texas Tech
Texas Tech Red Raiders football seasons
Texas Tech Red Raiders football